Hawke's Bay United was a professional Association football club based in Napier, New Zealand. HB United most recently played in the ISPS Handa Premiership – a semi-professional franchise based league, which ran independently of the winter club season. Local winter clubs provide the player pool for each franchise. Their home stadium is Bluewater Stadium.

History

Hawke’s Bay United (HBU) was founded in 2005 under the name of Napier City Soccer, as the summer entity of Central League club Napier City Rovers. In the inaugural NZFC season (2004–05), they finished 5th out of 8. The following season, Napier City Soccer was renamed to their current moniker of "Hawke's Bay United" and changed their kit colour to the Hawke's Bay provincial sporting colours of white and black, as part of an effort to greater represent the greater East Coast instead of just the city of Napier. The rebranded Hawkes Bay United finished last in the season standings.

Current squad
As of 17 February 2021

Staff
Current as of 6 December 2018

Managers
 Jonathan Gould (2006–09)
 Matt Chandler (2009–11)
 Chris Greatholder (2011–14)
 Brett Angell (2014–2018)

References

External links
Official site 

Association football clubs in New Zealand
Association football clubs established in 2005
Sport in the Hawke's Bay Region
2005 establishments in New Zealand